Spokesperson for the Ministry of Foreign Affairs is an official whose primary responsibility is to serve as the spokesperson for Iranian Ministry of Foreign Affairs.

List 
Source:

See also 
 Spokesperson of the Government of Iran

References 

 
Iranian spokespersons
Iran